Excelsior Athlétic Club was a French association football team playing in the city of Roubaix, Nord.

History
The team was founded in 1928 in a merger between Football Club de Roubaix and Excelsior Club de Tourcoing. In 1932, the team turned professional and played the first professional football season in 1932/1933 and won the same year its first major trophy, the Coupe de France. Till the World War II, the team managed to stay in Division 1. After the war, the club merged with RC Roubaix and US Tourcoing in CO Roubaix-Tourcoing (1945–1970). After 1970, the team struggled at an amateur level till its demise in 1995. In 1977, the team merged with Sporting Club de Roubaix to create Roubaix Football, which also merged in 1990 with Stade Roubaix (i.e. former RC Roubaix) but never managed to come back to Division 1, only playing the 1983/84 season in Division 2. The team ended due to financial problems.

Names of the club
1928–1944. Excelsior Athlétic Club de Roubaix.
1944–1970. in CO Roubaix-Tourcoing.
1970–1977. Excelsior Athlétic Club de Roubaix.
1977–1990. Roubaix Football
1990–1995. Stade Club Olympique de Roubaix (SCOR).

Honours
Coupe de France : 1933

Notable players
French international players
Célestin Delmer (5, 1933–1934)
Marcel Desrousseaux (2, 1935–1937)
Jean Gautheroux (1, 1936)
Henri Hiltl (1, 1944) (he played for Austria as Heinrich Hiltl, then for France as Henri Hiltl)
Marcel Langiller
Lucien Leduc
Noël Liétaer (7, 1933–1934)
Jean Sécember (4, 1935)

Managerial history
Charles Griffiths: 1932–1933
René Dedieu: 1933–1937
 Davidovitch: 1937–1939
Marcel Desrousseaux: 1970–1972
Pierre Cnude: 1972–1973
J. Schmidt: 1973–1975
Albert Dubreucq: 1975–1977
Sarrazyn: 1977–1980
Tony Giaquinto: 1980 – April 1987
Thierry Deneulin: April 1987–?
Boumedienne Belhadji: 1992–1994
Pierre Michelin: 1994–1995
Boumedienne Belhadji: 1995 – December 1995

See also
 CO Roubaix-Tourcoing
 RC Roubaix

References

External links
 History

 
Association football clubs established in 1928
Association football clubs disestablished in 1978
Excelsior AC
1928 establishments in France
1978 disestablishments in France
Excelsior AC Roubaix
Football clubs in Hauts-de-France
Ligue 1 clubs